String Quartet No. 15 may refer to:

 String Quartet No. 15 (Beethoven) by Ludwig van Beethoven
 String Quartet No. 15 (Hill) by Alfred Hill
 String Quartet No. 15 (Milhaud), Op. 291, No. 2, by Darius Milhaud
 String Quartet No. 15 (Mozart) by Wolfgang Amadeus Mozart
 String Quartet No. 15 (Schubert) by Franz Schubert
 String Quartet No. 15 (Shostakovich) by Dmitri Shostakovich
 String Quartet No. 15 (Simpson) by Robert Simpson
 String Quartet No. 15 (Spohr) by Louis Spohr
 String Quartet No. 15 (Villa-Lobos) by Heitor Villa-Lobos